This is a list of concept vehicles made by Toyota from the years 2020–2029.

HYBARI (2021)

The Toyota HYBARI (Hydrogen-Hybrid Advanced Rail vehicle for Innovation) is a train made in partnership with JR East and Hitachi. It will be a 100% hydrogen powered train that would run on the Tsurumi Line and Nambu Line. It is a FV-E991 series train with 2 cars, and has a top speed of 100 km/h.

Testing is planned to start in March 2022.

Aygo X prologue (2021)

The Aygo X prologue was unveiled in March 2021 by Toyota Motor Europe. It previewed the production Aygo X that was unveiled in November 2021.

bZ4X (2021)

GR Supra Sport Top Concept (2021)

The GR Supra Sport Top Concept is based on the J29 GR Supra. The roof of the car was removed and replaced with a carbon fibre targa top panel. The underside of the car was braced to retain the structural strength. A rear wing, custom rear diffuser and a custom exhaust system were also added. The vehicle was shown at the November 2020 SEMA360 online show.

GR Yaris Hydrogen (2021)

The GR Yaris Hydrogen is a GR Yaris with a modified G16E-GTS engine to run with hydrogen fuel.

Battery electric vehicles (2021) 

In December 2021, Toyota revealed a number of battery electric vehicle concepts to be produced up to 2025 as follows:

 Four bZ series models:
bZ Compact SUV (previewed again individually in December 2022)
bZ Large SUV
bZ Small Crossover
bZ SDN (sedan) (revealed as the bZ3 in October 2022)
 Compact Cruiser EV
 Crossover EV (revealed as the Crown Sport in July 2022)
 Pickup EV
 Small SU EV (further previewed as the C-HR prologue in December 2022)
 Sports EV
 Micro Box
 Mid Box

In addition, four Lexus-branded concepts were shown.

GR GT3 Concept (2022)  

The GR GT3 Concept is a GT3-inspired concept car that was shown at the January 2022 Tokyo Auto Salon.

bZ4X GR Sport Concept (2022)

The bZ4X GR Sport Concept is a tuned version of the bZ4X that was shown at the January 2022 Tokyo Auto Salon.

Kijang Innova EV Concept (2022)

The Kijang Innova EV Concept is an EV conversion prototype based on the second-generation Kijang Innova that was first presented on 31 March 2022 in Indonesia. The conversion was done by the Australian branch of SEA Electric, a company specialising in electric trucks conversion based in Melbourne, Australia. Five prototypes were built; three in Melbourne and two in Indonesia.

Corolla Cross H2 Concept (2022)

The Corolla Cross H2 Concept is a Corolla Cross fitted with a modified G16E-GTS engine to run with hydrogen fuel.

C-HR prologue (2022) 
The C-HR prologue was unveiled in December 2022 by Toyota Motor Europe. It previews the production second-generation C-HR which will be released in 2023.

IMV 0 (2022) 
The IMV 0 is a single-cab pickup concept that was presented on 14 December 2022 at the 60th anniversary event of Toyota Motor Thailand hosted by Akio Toyoda. Toyoda stated “Internally we call it the IMV 0 concept. Its official launch is actually over a year away, but I wanted all of you to be the first to see it!”. Based on the IMV platform, it was designed and engineered by Toyota Daihatsu Engineering & Manufacturing (TDEM) in collaboration with Japanese and Australian engineering teams. It features a compact and rugged design aesthetic, with extensive use of angular, boxy lines. It will be produced in 2023, with Toyota Motor Philippines announcing plans for local production of the IMV 0 using the Tamaraw nameplate.

Hilux Revo BEV Concept (2022) 
The Hilux Revo BEV Concept is an EV conversion prototype based on the eighth-generation Hilux that was presented on 14 December 2022 at the 60th anniversary event of Toyota Motor Thailand.

bZ Compact SUV (2022) 
Designed at Toyota European Design and Development (ED2), this previews an SUV in the bZ battery electric range. The wheels are at the extreme ends of the vehicle, with minimal overhangs. The seats are made from recycled plant material.

It was shown in Brussels and at the November 2022 Los Angeles Auto Show.

See also
Toyota concept vehicles (1935–1969)
Toyota concept vehicles (1970–1979)
Toyota concept vehicles (1980–1989)
Toyota concept vehicles (1990–1999)
Toyota concept vehicles (2000–2009)
Toyota concept vehicles (2010–2019)

References

Toyota
2020-2029